E3 ubiquitin-protein ligase Praja2 is an enzyme that in humans is encoded by the PJA2 gene.

Interactions 

PJA2 has been shown to interact with UBE2D2.

References

Further reading